Liptenara is a genus of butterflies in the family Lycaenidae. The three species of this genus are endemic to the Afrotropical realm.

Species
Liptenara batesi Bethune-Baker, 1915
Liptenara hiendlmayri (Dewitz, 1887)
Liptenara schoutedeni (Hawker-Smith, 1926)

References

 Seitz, A. Die Gross-Schmetterlinge der Erde 13: Die Afrikanischen Tagfalter. Plate XIII 61

Poritiinae
Lycaenidae genera
Taxa named by George Thomas Bethune-Baker